Laryne may refer to the following places in Ukraine:

 Laryne, Crimea, village in Dzhankoi Raion
 Laryne, Donetsk Oblast, urban-type settlement in Donetsk Municipality